The ethnarchy of Comana was a client-state of ancient Rome that lay between Pontus and Cappadocia. It was based around the city of Comana, Pontus and surrounding territories south of the Black Sea.

References

Roman client rulers
Roman Pontus
Roman towns and cities in Turkey
Roman client kingdoms
History of Tokat Province